Jared Bird (born 1 January 1998) is an English professional footballer who plays for Northern Premier League side Ilkeston Town as a midfielder.

Career

Youth career 
In June 2016, Bird was released by Derby County at the end of his two-year scholarship.

Barnsley 
Bird signed his first professional deal in July 2016, and spent the majority of the 2016–17 season as captain of the Under-23s. He was named in the first team squad on a single occasion but didn't make an appearance.

In June 2017, Bird signed a contract extension. On 15 August 2017, Bird made his debut in a 2–1 win over Nottingham Forest. He replaced George Moncur for a 24-minute cameo appearance from the bench.

Bird was released by Barnsley at the end of the 2019–20 season.

Yeovil Town loan 
On 4 January 2018, Bird joined League Two side Yeovil Town on loan until the end of the 2017–18 season.

Non-league
In October 2021, following his release from Barnsley, he signed for Northern Premier League Division One Midlands side Ilkeston Town.

Career statistics

References 

1998 births
Living people
English footballers
Association football midfielders
Barnsley F.C. players
Yeovil Town F.C. players
Ilkeston Town F.C. players
English Football League players
Northern Premier League players